Potrerillos Formation may refer to:
 Potrerillos Formation, Mexico, a Cretaceous to Paleocene geologic formation of Mexico
 Potrerillos Formation, Argentina, a Triassic geologic formation of the Cuyo Basin, Argentina